Magnolia × loebneri Kache is a hybrid of two Magnolia species, the Japanese Magnolia kobus and M. stellata.<ref>"In every way similar to M. stellata": Ben Blackburn, "A promising hybrid magnolia", New York Botanical Garden Journal (1951:43ff).</ref> crossed by Garteninspektor Max Löbner of Pillnitz, Germany, shortly before World War I; it first flowered  in 1917. Its fragrant late flowers, following its stellata parent by a couple of weeks, escape unexpected late spring frosts, but appear on the bare branches, to great effect. The deep pink buds open in informal strap-like tepals with pale shell pink upper surfaces and darker pink-purple lower ones. Like most magnolias, it thrives best on acid soils.

The selection, 'Leonard Messel' was a chance hybrid that was developed at Messel's garden in Sussex, Nymans. This plant has gained the Royal Horticultural Society's Award of Garden Merit. Also on the market are white 'Ballerina' and the late-flowering white 'Merrill' that extend the loebneri season.  The ‘White Rose’ cultivar is characterized by an upright flower form whose petals not become floppy and firm tepals that drop only after the blooms have faded.  'White Rose' was an open pollinated seedling of ‘Ballerina.'Magnolia × loebneri'' are susceptible to magnolia scale, just like other saucer, star, and lily magnolias.  But it is possible to grow healthy specimens with proper cultivation techniques, and by checking that plants are disease free when received.

Gallery

References

External links
 Magnolia × loebneri images in the Arnold Arboretum of Harvard University Plant Image Database
 Gapinsky, Andrew. "A magnolia with an Arboretum pedigree." Arnold Arboretum of Harvard University website, 24 April 2014. Accessed 27 April 2020.

loebneri
Ornamental trees